Jeong Woo-yeong (born 20 September 1999) is a South Korean professional footballer who plays as a winger or an attacking midfielder for Bundesliga club SC Freiburg and the South Korea national team.

Club career
On 30 June 2017, Jeong signed for Bayern Munich from South Korean club Incheon United. The contract runs until 30 June 2022. Jeong officially joined Bayern on 1 January 2018. Jeong made his first team debut for Bayern Munich in the UEFA Champions League on 27 November 2018, coming on as a substitute in the 81st minute for Thomas Müller against Benfica. On 3 May 2019, he started as right winger and won the final of the season's Premier League International Cup for Bayern Munich's under-23 team, earning the first club international trophy of his career. He was substituted by Jannik Rochelt in the 68th minute.

On 19 June 2019, SC Freiburg announced the signing of Jeong on a four-year deal with the option for Bayern Munich to buy him back. On 10 August 2019, he made his Freiburg debut against Magdeburg in the 2019–20 DFB-Pokal. However, he didn't appear in the field after his debut, and returned to Bayern on a loan deal. He contributed to reserve team's title by showing outstanding performances including one goal and eight assists during 15 appearances in the 2019–20 3. Liga.

On 12 December 2020 Jeong scored his first Bundesliga goal against Arminia Bielefeld after replacing Vincenzo Grifo in the 86th minute.

International career
He made his debut for South Korea national team on 25 March 2021 in a friendly against Japan. Because he shares the same with Jung Woo-young (정우영 in Korean, but both chose a different Romanization), who is also playing for the South Korean football national team, but 10 years older, he is also called "Jageun Jung Woo-young" ("little Jung Woo-young"; 작은 정우영).

On 16 November 2021,  Woo-yeong scored his first goal for the national team in a 2022 FIFA World Cup qualification against Iraq.

Career statistics

Club

International
Scores and results list South Korea's goal tally first, score column indicates score after each Jeong goal.

Honours
Bayern Munich II
 3. Liga: 2019–20
 Regionalliga Bayern: 2018–19

Bayern Munich
 Bundesliga: 2018–19

SC Freiburg
 DFB-Pokal runner-up: 2021–22

South Korea U14
Asian Youth Games: 2013

South Korea U17
Summer Youth Olympics silver medal: 2014

South Korea U23
AFC U-23 Championship: 2020

References

External links
 
 
 Jeong Woo-yeong at KFA

1999 births
Living people
Sportspeople from Incheon
South Korean footballers
South Korea youth international footballers
South Korea under-17 international footballers
South Korea under-20 international footballers
South Korea under-23 international footballers
South Korea international footballers
South Korean expatriate footballers
South Korean expatriate sportspeople in Germany
Expatriate footballers in Germany
Association football forwards
Association football wingers
Association football midfielders
FC Bayern Munich II players
FC Bayern Munich footballers
SC Freiburg players
Bundesliga players
3. Liga players
Regionalliga players
Footballers at the 2014 Summer Youth Olympics
2022 FIFA World Cup players